Hafslovatnet is a lake in the municipality of Luster in Vestland county, Norway.

It serves as a reservoir for the hydroelectric power station in Årøy. The primary inflow of the Hafslovatnet is via the short river Soget from the lake Veitastrondsvatnet. The primary outflow is the river Årøyelvi, which flows south into the Barsnesfjord, an inner part of the Sogndalsfjord, which, in turn, is a northern branch of the Sognefjord.

The eponymous village of Hafslo lies at the northern shore of the lake. The western part of the lake lies in the bird reserve Hafslovatnet.

Media gallery

See also
List of lakes in Norway

References

Lakes of Vestland
Reservoirs in Norway